Skjoldungen is a large uninhabited island in the King Frederick VI Coast, southeastern Greenland. Administratively it is part of the Sermersooq municipality. The weather of the island is characterized by tundra climate.

The island was named by Wilhelm August Graah (1793–1863) after Skjoldungen or Skioldungen, a honorific title for the successors (Scyldings) of legendary King Skjold to the ancient Danish throne in Norse mythology.

Geography
Skjoldungen is a coastal island in the southeastern shores of Greenland. It is located between two fjords, the Southern Skjoldungen Fjord, to the southwest, and the Northern Skjoldungen Fjord to the northeast between Skjoldungen and one of the arms of the Thorland Peninsula.

The island stretches  in a NE/SW direction. Its highest point is Azimuthbjerg, a 1,738 m high ultra-prominent peak at the NW end of the island. Skjoldungen Island has a rugged terrain, which includes the Skjoldmøen, Bjarje and Hjalte glaciers and the Gedebukken, Pandebrasken, Skuren and Sfinksen nunataks.
The southern part divides into two peninsulas jutting southeastwards, the Roar Peninsula and the Helge Peninsula. Skjoldungen's southernmost headland is Cape Niels Juel, a narrow cape of reddish-brown rock at the end of the Helge Peninsula.  long Anarnitsoq island lies just to the west of the cape.

History
Since the eastern coast of Greenland was inhabited by Paleo-Eskimo people around 4,000 years ago, the Skjoldungen Fjords were likely inhabited or visited by nomadic hunters. At the Qoornoq site, located on a small headland by the shore of the Southern Skjoldungen Fjord, there are archaeological remains of later historical periods. These include Thule culture graves indicating that Inuit lived on the island after the 13th century.

There are remains of relatively recent abandoned Inuit dwellings inside the fjord on Skjoldungen's western shore. These date back to 1938 when one hundred and fifty Inuit from Ammassalik were convinced by the Danish authorities to settle in this large island.
The inhabitants of the Inuit settlement were relocated in 1965 following a nationwide program to concentrate the population of Greenland in a few larger towns. Another reason was that fishing and hunting were not enough to keep the population even close to a state of self-sufficiency.

Currently the island is a popular destination with tourists on cruise ships to Greenland owing to its impressive landscapes.

See also
List of islands of Greenland
Finnsbu, a 1931 - 1933 Norwegian station in Skjoldungen District

Bibliography
Mette Felbo, Grønlandske sommertelte, Grønland, Årg. 41, nr. 1 (1993), p. 19-29
Hans Christian Gulløv, Thulekulturen i Sydøstgrønland - set fra Skjoldungen, Forskning i Grønland, 1994, nr. 1/2, pp. 21–31
Hans Christian Gulløv, Minik T. Rosing, Projekt Skjoldungen 1990-92 : baggrund og feltarbejde, Forskning i Grønland, 1994, nr. 1/2, pp. 8-12, on the 1992 ethnographic/archaeological expedition 'Projekt Skjoldungen'; background to the fieldwork
Jette Lewinsky, Mosses of the Skjoldungen Area, Southeast Greenland, Lindbergia Vol. 1, No. 1/2 (1971), pp. 83-90
Spencer Apollonio, Lands That Hold One Spellbound: A Story of East Greenland, 2008
Hans Christian Gulløv, Archaeological Commentary on the Isotopic Study of the Greenland Thule Culture, Journal of the North Atlantic, Special Volume 3 (2012): 65–76

References

External links
Skjoldungen pictures
Geochemical Constraints on the Origin of the Late Archean Skjoldungen Alkaline Igneous Province, SE Greenland
New insights on the north-eastern part of the Ketilidian orogen in South-East Greenland

Former populated places in Greenland
Sermersooq
Uninhabited islands of Greenland
World War II sites in Greenland